Automoto was a French bicycle and motorcycle manufacturer founded in 1902, which joined with the Peugeot group in 1930 and was fully absorbed by 1962.  Prior to World War II Automoto sourced engines from Chaise, Zurcher, J.A.P., and Villers.  Engines produced by Ateliers de Mécanique du Centre (AMC) were also used after 1945.

Notes

External links
Cycles Automoto: Setting the Standard

Defunct motorcycle manufacturers of France